North Skelton is a village in the unitary authority of Redcar and Cleveland and the ceremonial county of North Yorkshire, England.

North Skelton experienced a boom in the 1870s when North Skelton ironstone mine was opened.

The village used to have a railway station on the line between Teesside and Whitby West Cliff railway station. The station opened to traffic in July 1902 and closed to passengers in September 1951. the line is still open to carry freight from Skinningrove Steelworks and Boulby Mine.

North Skelton lends its name to a particular English Long Sword Dance that was performed at villages and towns in the area. The North Skelton Sword Dance, like many other northern dances, is akin to Morris Dancing, but the sword dances are geographical being that they are mainly located in the north. Performances of the North Skelton Sword Dance have been revived by the Claro Sword Dancers.

References

External links

Villages in North Yorkshire
Places in the Tees Valley
Redcar and Cleveland